Dolga Brda is a dispersed settlement in the hills northwest of Prevalje in the Carinthia region in northern Slovenia, right on the border with Austria. The Holmec international border crossing is located in Dolga Brda.

References

External links

Dolga Brda on Geopedia

Populated places in the Municipality of Prevalje